Alejandro Llorente y Lannas (1814 in Cádiz, Spain – 30 December 1901, in Madrid, Spain) was a Spanish politician, writer, journalist and historian who served as Minister of State in 1864, in a cabinet headed by Ramón María Narváez, 1st Duke of Valencia. He was a Knight of the Golden Fleece and Knight Grand Cross of the Order of Charles III.

Sources
Geneall.net. Alejandro Llorente y Lannas
Personal dossier of D. Alejandro LLorente. Spanish Senate

|-

Economy and finance ministers of Spain
Foreign ministers of Spain
Knights of the Golden Fleece
1814 births
1901 deaths
Politicians from Cádiz
Moderate Party (Spain) politicians
19th-century Spanish politicians